Oedopa ascriptiva is a species of ulidiid or picture-winged fly in the genus Oedopa of the family Ulidiidae.

Distribution
United States.

References

Ulidiidae
Insects described in 1909
Taxa named by Friedrich Georg Hendel
Diptera of North America